Zatrephes krugeri is a moth in the family Erebidae. It was described by Reich in 1934. It is found in Brazil.

References

Phaegopterina
Moths described in 1934